Mélykút is a town in Bács-Kiskun county, in the Southern Great Plain region of Hungary in Bacska.

Geography

References

External links 

  

Populated places in Bács-Kiskun County
Towns in Hungary